The Shiv Vihar metro station is located on the Pink Line of the Delhi Metro, opened on 31 October 2018. This is one of the two stations, which are located on Delhi–Baghpat–Yamunotri National Highway 709B. Shiv Vihar station is adjacent to Loni Border Jawahar Nagar Area and located 25 km from Baghpat.

This metro station named Shiv Vihar is actually situated 1.6 km from Shiv Vihar, while Shiv Vihar is a part of North East Delhi and the station was built at Loni border.

As part of Phase III of Delhi Metro, Shiv Vihar is the terminal metro station of the Pink Line.

Connections

Station layout

See also
List of Delhi Metro stations
Transport in Delhi
Delhi Metro Rail Corporation
Delhi Suburban Railway

References

External links

 Delhi Metro Rail Corporation Ltd. (Official site)
 Delhi Metro Annual Reports
 

Delhi Metro stations
Railway stations in Ghaziabad district, India